The transversus menti, or transverse muscle of the chin, is a facial muscle that is often considered to be the superficial fibers of the depressor anguli oris muscle which cross to the other side of the face.

Muscles of the head and neck

it:Muscolo depressore dell'angolo della bocca#Muscolo trasverso del mento